Sequential walking is a technique that can be used to solve various 2D NMR spectra.  In a 2D experiment, cross peaks must be correlated to the correct nuclei.  Using sequential walking, the correct nuclei can be assigned to their crosspeaks.  The assigned crosspeaks can give valuable information such as spatial interactions between nuclei.

In a NOESY of DNA, for example, each nucleotide has a different chemical shift associated with it.  In general, A's are more downstream, T's are more upstream, and C's and G's are intermediate.  Each nucleotide has protons on the deoxyribose sugar, which can be assigned using sequential walking.  To do this, the first nucleotide in the sequence must be detected.  Knowing the DNA sequence helps, but in general the first nucleotide can be determined using the following rules.

1. 2' and 2" protons of a nucleotide will show up in its column, as well as in the column of the next nucleotide in the sequence.  For example, in the sequence CATG, in the column for C, its own 2' and 2" protons will be seen, but none of the other nucleotides.  For A, its own 2' and 2" protons will be seen, as well as those from C.

2. Methyl groups on the nucleotide are seen in the column for the nucleotide containing a methyl group, as well as for the nucleotide preceding it.  For example, in CATG, the A and T will contain the methyl peak corresponding to the methyl group on T, but G will not.

Once the first nucleotide has been found, you determine which nucleotide is next to it because it should contain the 2' and 2" protons from the previous nucleotide.  This is done by "walking" across the spectrum.  This process is then repeated sequentially until all nucleotides have been assigned.

Nuclear magnetic resonance